Macrozamia lucida is a species of plant in the family Zamiaceae. It is endemic to Australia.

Distribution and habitat
This species is found in Southern Queensland, from around Brisbane north to Nambour, in coastal wet sclerophyll forest.

References

 Whitelock, Loran M. The Cycads. Timber press (2002)

External links
The Cycads pages: Macrozamia lucida

lucida
Flora of New South Wales
Flora of Queensland
Cycadophyta of Australia
Endemic flora of Australia
Least concern flora of Australia
Least concern biota of Queensland
Taxonomy articles created by Polbot